Ionel Badiu (born 29 July 1989) is a Romanian rugby union football player. He plays as a  prop for professional Rugby Pro D2 club, Carcassonne. He also plays for Romania's national team, the Oaks, making his international debut at the 2014 IRB Nations Cup in a match against the Russian Bears.

Career
Before joining Timișoara Saracens, Ionel Badiu played for Mazamétain and most recently for Rodez Aveyron in Fédérale 1 championship.

References

External links
Ionel Badiu's Profile at ESPN
Ionel Badiu's Profile at It'srugby

1989 births
Living people
People from Vrancea County
Romanian rugby union players
Romania international rugby union players
Rugby union props
US Carcassonne players